Glenside is a suburb of Wellington, New Zealand. It is bounded by Tawa to the North, Churton Park to the West/South and Grenada across the motorway to the East.

Glenside was first settled in 1840.  Ngāti Toa are the mana whenua.  The area was known as "The Halfway" from 1840 until 1928.

Transport  
Middleton Road was part of the 19th-century Old Porirua Road north from Wellington.

Public transport is provided by No 60 and No 60e Metlink buses from Wellington via Johnsonville which run down Middleton Road to Tawa and Porirua.

A 2017 report said that a proposed commuter railway station near Churton Park on the Kapiti Line (and actually in Glenside) was too expensive.

Renaming
A competition was held to rename the suburb in 1928, to coincide with the opening of the Post Office. Local landowner Mrs P.C. Watts' suggestion of Glenside was selected. She felt the area was reminiscent of a Scottish glen.

The Halfway House
A halfway house is a place for travellers to rest, usually halfway between two settlements. A Halfway house was built in 1841 by Anthony and Susannah Wall. The Halfway was the halfway resting-place for travelers journeying between Wellington and Porirua along a Maori trail. The route this trail traversed from Kaiwharawhara to Porirua was to be modified and enlarged and become known as the Porirua Road.

Maori trail and Old Porirua Road
The development of the Old Porirua Road north of The Halfway halted at The Halfway due to tension between the Government Administrators and Ngāti Toa. The issues for Ngāti Toa involved questionable land purchases by Colonel Wakefield of the New Zealand Company before the signing of the Treaty of Waitangi in 1840. This resulted in the Wairau Affray  (1843), the Boulcott Farm hostilities in the Hutt Valley (1846) and the skirmish at Battle Hill (1846).

World War II Anti-tank trap
There are remains of a WW2 Tank trap, on private land near Middleton Road. At the time of building this trap the road was known as "Porirua Road". This road was the only road between Wellington and Porirua. Remnants of the tank traps were rediscovered by railway workers in 2008.

Public works camp and construction plant

A public works camp was built at Glenside to house workers building the Tawa Flat deviation of the North Island Main Trunk railway, constructed from 1924 to 1937. The northern portal of the long No 2 tunnel is at Glenside.

The remains of a rock crusher  remain in Rowells Road, Glenside, and can be seen from Middleton Road. Crushed rock from the crusher was used for the foundations of the railway deviation, and remains of the rock crusher form part of Rowells Road.

References

External links
Heritage Trail: Northern Suburbs - Following the Old Porirua Road, Wellington City Council

Suburbs of Wellington City
1840 establishments in New Zealand